Masthi  is a village in the southern state of Karnataka, India. It is located in the Malur taluk of Kolar district in Karnataka.

Demographics
 India census, Masthi had a population of 6,409 with 3,276 males and 3,133 females.

History
Although early history is unknown, it is known that this place was ruled by "Maha Hasti" (pah-leh-gara) (petty chieftains) until a new system of governance was introduced after English entry into Mysore. Masthi had a significant Brahmin population in mid 1900s but not many remain to this day. Masthi Venkatesha Iyengar, a Kannada writer, is from Masthi.

See also
 Kolar
 Districts of Karnataka

References

External links
 http://Kolar.nic.in/

Villages in Kolar district